Novogolyelan is a rural locality (a selo) and the administrative center of Novogolyelanskoye Rural Settlement, Gribanovsky District, Voronezh Oblast, Russia. The population was 639 as of 2010. There are 8 streets.

Geography 
Novogolyelan is located 62 km west of Gribanovsky (the district's administrative centre) by road. Khomutovka is the nearest rural locality.

References 

Rural localities in Gribanovsky District